Safe Swiss Cloud is a Swiss-based cloud Infrastructure as a Service (IaaS) company.  The company provides computing power (CPU, RAM, data storage), object storage and managed services.

History 
Founded in 2013 by Prodosh Banerjee and Gerald Dürr.  

In 2015, cloud services expanded to several data centres, while investing in equipment to increase capacity.  

In 2017, Safe Swiss Cloud added a number of new platforms to its offerings, including Kubernetes & Openshift, Openstack and VMware/vCloud. An investment has been made to expand clustered and redundant solid-state drive (SSD) storage capacity.

Services 
Cloud computing service designed to offer computer, storage and managed cloud services. The company's cloud computing service includes an infrastructure service that offers virtual data centers that include firewall, router, network.

Acquisitions 
In August 2015, Safe Swiss Cloud acquired Basel based Nexos, an IT services company. 

In late 2017 Everyware AG, a Swiss IT services company, acquired a controlling stake in Safe Swiss Cloud.

Awards 
In November 2015, the company was announced as a winner of the "Bully Awards" issued to European organizations that stand out through innovation, leadership and exceptional growth.

In December 2015, Safe Swiss Cloud was named best practice for finance applications in the Cloud by the European Union Agency for Network and Information Security (ENISA) in the report "Secure Use of Cloud Computing in the Finance Sector".

Research 
Safe Swiss Cloud collaborated with the Zurich University of Applied Sciences/ZHAW to research cyber intelligence and advanced cloud billing systems. This research was supported by CTI, the Swiss government's research and innovation program for industry.

References 

2013 establishments in Switzerland
As a service
Cloud applications
Web services
Cloud computing providers
Cloud platforms